This is a listing of bands and musicians in the alternative country genre.

0–9
16 Horsepower

A

Ryan Adams
Jill Andrews
The Autumn Defense

B

Backyard Tire Fire
Del Barber
Eef Barzelay
Bear's Den
Rico Bell
Blitzen Trapper
Blue Rodeo
Bosque Brown
The Bottle Rockets
BR549
Jim Bryson
Richard Buckner

C

Caitlin Cary
Neko Case
Cross Canadian Ragweed

D

The Deep Dark Woods
The Devil Makes Three
Drive-By Truckers

E

Tim Easton
Carrie Elkin
Elliott Brood
Alejandro Escovedo

F

Jay Farrar
Fifth on the Floor
Rosie Flores
Freakwater
Robbie Fulks

G

Mary Gauthier
Giant Sand
Golden Smog
The Gourds
Green on Red
Grievous Angels
The Guthries
Sarah Lee Guthrie

H

Hacienda Brothers
Wayne Hancock
The Handsome Family
Thomas Hansen (aka Saint Thomas)
Hazeldine
Patterson Hood

I

I See Hawks In L.A.
Jason Isbell

J

The Jayhawks
Jolene

L

Legendary Shack Shakers
Graham Lindsey
The Little Willies
Lucero
Lydia Loveless

M

Carolyn Mark
The Mastersons
Chris Mills
Milton Mapes
Elizabeth Mitchell
John Moreland
James McMurtry

O

Old 97's
Old Crow Medicine Show
Mark Olson
Lindi Ortega

P

Gram Parsons
Joe Pernice

R

Richmond Fontaine
Jason Ringenberg
Bruce Robison
Carrie Rodriguez
Roman Candle
Justin Rutledge
Matthew Ryan

S

Scud Mountain Boys
Son Volt
Souled American
Split Lip Rayfield
Jesse Sykes
Jesse Sykes & the Sweet Hereafter

T

Tarnation
Three O'Clock Train
Tres Chicas
Jeff Tweedy
Two Cow Garage

U

Ugly Casanova
Uncle Tupelo
Suzie Ungerleider (aka Oh Susanna)

V
Townes Van Zandt

W

The Waco Brothers
Water Liars
Whiskeytown
Wilco
Kelly Willis

References

Bibliography

 
Alternative country musicians